The 2018 New York Mets season was the franchise's 57th season and the team's 10th season at Citi Field. They attempted to return to the postseason after an injury-plagued under-performance in 2017. This was their first season with Mickey Callaway as manager, succeeding Terry Collins.

The Mets got off to a franchise record 11-1 start  and ended the month of April with a 17-9 record, in 1st place in the National League East. However, they went 61-76 the rest of the way, and were eliminated from playoff contention by mid-September.

Spring training
The Mets had a rough spring training with a record of 7–15–3 (ties). They ended the spring by winning an exhibition game 3–1 over the Las Vegas 51s.

Regular season

March
The Mets began the regular season on March 29, 2018, with their home opener with a 9–4 win over the St. Louis Cardinals at Citi Field in Queens, New York. They ended up winning the first two games of the season.

April
On April 1, the Mets started the month losing 1–5 to the St. Louis Cardinals, finishing the series two out of three. After, they went on a 9–game win streak, which put them in first place in the NL East. They finished the month going 15–9 and having a strong win (14–2) over the San Diego Padres.

May
On May 1, the Mets started the month losing 3-2 to the Atlanta Braves at Citi Field. They went on a 6–game losing streak, but broke out of it seven days later by beating the Cincinnati Reds 7–6. The one highlight of the month was a three–game sweep of the Arizona Diamondbacks. However, the remaining weeks didn't fare well.

June

The Mets started the month continuing their losing streak when the Chicago Cubs swept them in four games. They snapped their 8–game losing streak by beating their crosstown rivals, the New York Yankees 2–0 in the last game of the three-game Subway Series, handing the Bronx Bombers their first shutout loss of the season. The Mets finished the month 5–21, second to last place in the NL East behind their division rivals, the Miami Marlins, losing the first two games of the series to them.

July

The Mets started the month winning the last game of the series with the Miami Marlins by a score of 5–2. The team set a franchise record on July 31 for its worst loss ever, suffering a 25–4 defeat against the Washington Nationals.

August

The Mets started the month continuing their loss from last month in a two game set to the Washington Nationals. The team also lost two in a row to the Atlanta Braves, however, they snapped their three game losing streak with a 3–0 shutout win in the next game against their rivals. A day after trouncing the Baltimore Orioles 16–5, on August 16, the Mets went on another tear and set a franchise record by scoring 24 runs in a win over division rivals Philadelphia Phillies; the final score was 24–4. They went on to win 3 out of 5 games. The highlight of the series, the Mets beat the Phillies 8–2 in the second annual Little League Classic at BB&T Ballpark in Williamsport, PA. The month ended with the Mets losing against the San Francisco Giants 7–0, finishing August with equal wins and losses at 15–15.

September
The Mets started the month with beating the San Francisco Giants two games in-a-row, taking 2 out of 3 games in the series. After that, they took 2 of 3 games from the Los Angeles Dodgers and Philadelphia Phillies, thus spoiling their playoff hopes. They also clinched their 7th straight season with a winning record against the Phillies, one short of a major league record, in that series. The Mets then played a rainy 4-game series with the Miami Marlins managing to win 3 out of 4; the one loss by the NL Cy Young candidate Jacob deGrom. deGrom pitched 7 innings and gave up two runs making his current ERA 1.71, but Jose Urena outdueled him.

Season standings

National League East

National League Division Leaders

Record vs. opponents

Detailed records

= The 2018 MLB Little League Classic was a Phillies home game, and the Mets won.

Roster

Game log

|-style=background:#bfb
|1 || March 29 || Cardinals ||9–4 || Syndergaard (1–0) || Martinez (0–1) || — || Citi Field || 44,189 || 1–0 
|-style=background:#bfb
|2 ||March 31 || Cardinals || 6–2 || deGrom (1–0)|| Wacha (0–1)|| Familia (1) || Citi Field || 36,098 || 2–0
|-

|-style=background:#fbb
|3||April 1|| Cardinals || 1–5 || Weaver (1–0)|| Matz (0–1) || — || Citi Field || 22,468 || 2–1
|-style=background:#bbb
| — || April 2 || Phillies || colspan=7 | Postponed (inclement weather: snow). Makeup date: July 9
|-style=background:#bfb
|4||April 3|| Phillies || 2–0 || Blevins (1–0) || Lively (0–1)|| Familia (2) || Citi Field || 21,397 || 3–1
|-style=background:#bfb
|5||April 4|| Phillies || 4–2 || Gsellman (1–0) || Hutchinson (1–1) || Familia (3) || Citi Field || 21,328 || 4–1
|-style=background:#bfb
|6||April 5||@ Nationals || 8–2 || deGrom (2–0) || Strasburg (1–1) || — || Nationals Park || 42,477 || 5–1
|-style=background:#bfb
|7||April 7||@ Nationals || 3–2 || Robles (1–0) || Kintzler (0–1) || Familia (4) || Nationals Park || 28,952 || 6–1
|-style=background:#bfb
|8||April 8||@ Nationals || 6–5 (12) || Lugo (1–0) || Kintzler (0–2) || Rhame (1) || Nationals Park || 21,579 || 7–1
|-style=background:#bfb
|9||April 9||@ Marlins || 4–2 || Syndergaard (2–0)|| Ureña (0–2) || Familia (5) || Marlins Park || 7,003 || 8–1
|-style=background:#bfb
|10||April 10||@ Marlins || 8–6 || Robles (2–0) || Ziegler (0–2) || Familia (6) || Marlins Park || 6,516 || 9–1
|-style=background:#bfb
|11||April 11||@ Marlins || 4–1 || Wheeler (1–0) || O'Grady (0–1) || — || Marlins Park || 6,150 || 10–1
|-style=background:#bfb
|12||April 13|| Brewers || 6–5 || Matz (1–1) || Davies (0–2) || Familia (7) || Citi Field || 34,921 || 11–1
|-style=background:#fbb
|13||April 14|| Brewers || 1–5 || Anderson (1–1)  || Harvey (0–1) || Hader (1)|| Citi Field || 40,965 || 11–2
|-style=background:#bfb
|14||April 15|| Brewers || 3–2 || Familia (1–0)|| Albers (2–1) || — || Citi Field || 26,035 || 12–2
|-style=background:#fbb
|15||April 16|| Nationals || 6–8 || Cole (1–1)|| Ramos (0–1) || Madson (2) || Citi Field || 22,829 || 12–3
|-style=background:#fbb
|16||April 17|| Nationals || 2–5 || Gonzalez (2–1) || Wheeler (1–1) || Doolittle (3) || Citi Field || 22,724 || 12–4
|-style=background:#bfb
|17||April 18|| Nationals || 11–5 || Ramos (1–1) || Madson (0–2) || — || Citi Field || 23,117 || 13–4
|-style=background:#fbb
|18||April 19||@ Braves || 4–12 || Wisler (1–0) || Harvey (0–2) || — || SunTrust Park || 23,610 || 13–5
|-style=background:#bfb
|19||April 20||@ Braves || 5–3 (12) || Gsellman (2–0) || Ravin (0–1)|| Familia || SunTrust Park || 39,016 || 14–5
|-style=background:#fbb
|20||April 21||@ Braves || 3–4 || Biddle (1–0) || Familia (1–1) || — || SunTrust Park || 41,396 || 14–6
|-style=background:#bbb
| — ||April 22||@ Braves || colspan=7 | Postponed (inclement weather). Makeup date: May 28, double header
|-style=background:#bfb
|21||April 24||@ Cardinals || 6–5 || Gsellman (3–0) || Bowman (0–1) || Familia (9) || Busch Stadium || 36,237 || 15–6
|-style=background:#fbb
|22||April 25||@ Cardinals || 1–9 || Wacha (4–1) || Matz (1–2) ||   Brebbia (1) || Busch Stadium || 38,045 || 15–7
|-style=background:#fbb
|23||April 26||@ Cardinals || 3–4 (13) || Gant (1–0) || Sewald (0–1) || — || Busch Stadium || 37,762 || 15–8
|-style=background:#bfb
|24||April 27||@ Padres || 5–1 || deGrom (3–0) || Richard (1–3) || — || Petco Park || 29,997 || 16–8
|-style=background:#fbb
|25||April 28||@ Padres || 2–12 || Lucchesi (3–1) || Vargas (0–1) || — || Petco Park || 42,778 || 16–9
|-style=background:#bfb
|26||April 29||@ Padres || 14–2 || Wheeler (2–1) || Mitchell (0–3) || — || Petco Park || 34,639 || 17–9
|-

|-style=background:#fbb
|27|| May 1 || Braves || 2–3 || Soroka (1–0) || Syndergaard (2–1) || Vizcaíno (4) || Citi Field || 22,527 ||17–10
|-style=background:#fbb
|28|| May 2 || Braves || 0–7 || Newcomb (2–1) || Sewald (0–2) ||—|| Citi Field || 23,528 || 17–11
|-style=background:#fbb
|29|| May 3 || Braves || 0–11 ||  Teherán (2–1) || Vargas (0–2) || — || Citi Field || 26,882 || 17–12
|-style=background:#fbb
|30|| May 4 || Rockies || 7–8 || Márquez (2–3) || Wheeler (2–2) || Davis (12) || Citi Field || 34,030 || 17–13
|-style=background:#fbb
|31||May 5|| Rockies || 0–2 || Bettis (4–1) || Matz (1–3) || Davis (13) || Citi Field || 37,550 || 17–14
|-style=background:#fbb
|32||May 6|| Rockies || 2–3 || Freeland (2–4) || Robles (2–1) ||Ottavino (1) || Citi Field || 33,580 || 17–15
|-style=background:#bfb
|33||May 7||@ Reds || 7–6 || Gsellman (4–0) || Bailey (0–5)|| Familia (10)|| Great American Ball Park || 15,187 || 18–15
|-style=background:#fbb
|34||May 8||@ Reds || 2–7 || Castillo (2–4) || Vargas (0–3) || — || Great American Ballpark || 14,804|| 18–16
|-style=background:#fbb
|35||May 9||@ Reds || 1–2 (10) || Iglesias (1–0) || Ramos (1–2) || — || Great American Ballpark || 16,452 || 18–17
|-style=background:#bfb
|36||May 11||@ Phillies || 3–1 || Ramos (2–2)
|Neris (1–3)||Familia (11) || Citizens Bank Park || 29,247|| 19–17
|-style=background:#bbb
|–||May 12||@ Phillies || colspan="7" |Postponed (inclimate weather). Make up date: August 16, double header
|-style=background:#fbb
|37||May 13||@ Phillies || 2–4 || Nola (6–1)|| Sewald (0–3) || Ramos (1)|| Citizens Bank Park || 34,091 ||19–18
|-style=background:#bfb
|38||May 15|| Blue Jays || 12–2 || Syndergaard (3–1) || García (2–3) || — || Citi Field || 28,967 || 20–18
|-style=background:#fbb
|39||May 16|| Blue Jays || 1–12 ||Happ (5–3) || Wheeler (2–3) || — || Citi Field || 28,400 || 20–19
|-style=background:#bfb
|40||May 18|| Diamondbacks || 3–1 || deGrom (4–0) || Godley (4–3) || Familia (12) || Citi Field || 31,285 || 21–19
|-style=background:#bfb
|41||May 19|| Diamondbacks || 5–4 || Familia (2–1) || Chafin (0–1) ||—|| Citi Field || 39,515 || 22–19
|-style=background:#bfb
|42||May 20|| Diamondbacks || 4–1 || Syndergaard (4–1) || De La Rosa (1–0) || Gsellman (1) || Citi Field || 34,894 || 23–19
|-style=background:#bfb
|43||May 21|| Marlins || 2–0 || Vargas (1–3) || Hernandez (0–1)  || Familia (13) || Citi Field || 22,505 || 24–19
|-style=background:#fbb
|44||May 22|| Marlins || 1–5 || Smith (3–5) || Wheeler (2–4) ||—|| Citi Field || 22,195 || 24–20
|-style=background:#fbb
|45||May 23|| Marlins || 1–2 || Conley (1–0) || Familia (2–2) || Ziegler (9) || Citi Field || 24,808 || 24–21
|-style=background:#bfb
|46||May 24||@ Brewers || 5–0 || Matz (2–3)|| Davies (2–4)||—|| Miller Park || 33,803 || 25–21
|-style=background:#fbb
|47||May 25||@ Brewers || 3–4 (10) || Jeffress (4–0) || Gsellman (4–1) ||—|| Miller Park || 28,286 || 25–22
|-style=background:#fbb
|48||May 26||@ Brewers || 6–17 || Jennings (3–1) || Rhame (0–1) ||—|| Miller Park || 37,258 || 25–23
|-style=background:#fbb
|49||May 27||@ Brewers || 7–8 || Logan (1–0) || Blevins (1–1) || Jnebel (4)|| Miller Park || 39,715 || 25–24
|-style=background:#fbb
|50||May 28||@ Braves || 3–4 ||Carle (3–1) || Lugo (1–1)||—|| SunTrust Park || 32,377 || 25–25
|-style=background:#bfb
|51||May 28||@ Braves || 8–5 ||Gsellman (5–1) || Minter (3–1) || Familia (14)|| SunTrust Park || 31,779 || 26–25
|-style=background:#fbb
|52||May 29||@ Braves || 6–7 ||Winkler (2–0) || Bautista (0–1)||—|| SunTrust Park || 19,443 || 26–26
|-style=background:#bfb
|53||May 30||@ Braves || 4–1 || Vargas (2–3) || Teherán (4–3) || Gsellman (2) || SunTrust Park || 21,449 || 27–26
|-style=background:#fbb
|54||May 31|| Cubs || 1–5 || Quintana (6–4)|| Robles (2–2) || Morrow (13) || Citi Field || 34,458 || 27–27
|-

|-style=background:#fbb
|55||June 1|| Cubs || 4–7 || Rosario (2–0)|| Sewald (0–4) || Morrow (14) || Citi Field || 37,458 || 27–28
|-style=background:#fbb
|56||June 2|| Cubs || 1–7 (14) || Farrell (2–2) || Baumann (0–2) ||—|| Citi Field || 32,817 || 27–29
|-style=background:#fbb
|57||June 3|| Cubs || 0–2 || Lester (6–2) || Matz (2–4) || Duensing (1) || Citi Field || 34,946 || 27–30
|-style=background:#fbb
|58||June 5|| Orioles || 1–2 || Cobb (2–7) || Vargas (2–4) || Brach (9) || Citi Field || 25,342 || 27–31
|-style=background:#fbb
|59||June 6|| Orioles || 0–1 || Bundy (4–7) || Familia (2–3) || Brach (10) || Citi Field || 30,366 || 27–32
|-style=background:#fbb
|60||June 8|| Yankees || 1–4 || Green (4–0) || deGrom (4–1)|| Chapman (16) || Citi Field || 42,961 || 27–33
|-style=background:#fbb
|61||June 9|| Yankees || 3–4 || Robertson (5–2) || Swarzak (0–1) ||Chapman (17)|| Citi Field || 43,603 || 27–34
|-style=background:#bfb
|62||June 10|| Yankees || 2–0 || Lugo (2–1)|| Severino (9–2)|| Swarzak (1) || Citi Field || 36,171 || 28–34
|-style=background:#fbb
|63||June 12||@ Braves || 2–8 || Carle (4–1) || Wheeler (2–5) ||—|| SunTrust Park || 29,892 || 28–35
|-style=background:#fbb
|64||June 13||@ Braves || 0–2 || Soroka (2–1) || deGrom (4–2) || Vizcaíno (12) || SunTrust Park || 32,015 || 28–36
|-style=background:#fbb
|65||June 14||@ Diamondbacks || 3–6 || Koch (5–3) || Vargas (2–5) || Boxberger (15) || Chase Field || 23,300 || 28–37
|-style=background:#fbb
|66||June 15||@ Diamondbacks || 3–7 || Godley (7–5) || Lugo (2–2) || Boxberger (16) || Chase Field || 32,170 || 28–38
|-style=background:#bfb
|67||June 16||@ Diamondbacks || 5–1 || Matz (3–4) || Corbin (6–3) ||—|| |Chase Field || 31,824 || 29–38
|-style=background:#bfb
|68||June 17||@ Diamondbacks || 5–3 || Familia (3–3) || Boxberger (1–3) || Gsellman (3) || Chase Field || 47,907 || 30–38
|-style=background:#bfb
|69||June 18||@ Rockies || 12–2 || deGrom (5–2) || Anderson (4–2) ||—|| Coors Field || 33,815 || 31–38
|-style=background:#fbb
|70||June 19||@ Rockies || 8–10 || Márquez (5–7)|| Vargas (2–6)||—|| Coors Field || 29,710 || 31–39
|-style=background:#fbb
|71||June 20||@ Rockies || 8–10 || Shaw (3–5) ||  Gsellman (5–2) || Davis (21) || Coors Field || 38,685 || 31–40
|-style=background:#fbb
|72||June 21||@ Rockies || 4–6 || Freeland (7–6) || Matz (3–5) || McGee (1) || Coors Field || 44,010 || 31–41
|-style=background:#fbb
|73||June 22|| Dodgers || 2–5 || Wood (3–5) || Wheeler (2–6) ||Jansen (19) || Citi Field || 32,565 || 31–42
|-style=background:#fbb
|74||June 23|| Dodgers || 3–8 || Ferguson (1–1)|| deGrom (5–3)||—|| Citi Field || 37,705 || 31–43
|-style=background:#fbb
|75||June 24|| Dodgers || 7–8 (11) || Hudson (2–2) || Flexen (0–1) ||—|| Citi Field || 34,060 || 31–44
|-style=background:#fbb
|76||June 25|| Pirates || 4–6 || Taillon (5–6)|| Lugo (2–3)|| Vázquez (15) || Citi Field || 22,135 || 31–45
|-style=background:#bfb
|77||June 26|| Pirates || 4–3 || Peterson (1–0) || Brault (5–2) ||—|| Citi Field || 24,501 || 32–45
|-style=background:#fbb
|78||June 27|| Pirates || 3–5 || Vázquez (3–2) || Familia (3–4) ||—|| Citi Field || 24,506 || 32–46
|-style=background:#fbb
|79||June 29||@ Marlins || 2–8 || Alcantara (1–0) || Oswalt (0–1) ||—|| Marlins Park || 8,211 || 32–47
|-style=background:#fbb
|80||June 30||@ Marlins || 2–5 || Lopez (1–0) || deGrom (5–4) || Barraclough (8) || Marlins Park || 10,523 || 32–48
|-

|-style=background:#bfb
|81||July 1||@ Marlins || 5–2 || Matz (4–5) || Straily (3–4) || Familia (15) || Marlins Park || 9,611 || 33–48
|-style=background:#fbb
|82||July 3||@ Blue Jays || 6–8 || Axford (2–1)|| Peterson (1–1)|| Clippard (6) || Rogers Centre || 24,010 || 33–49
|-style=background:#bfb
|83||July 4||@ Blue Jays || 6–3 || Lugo (3–3) || Stroman (1–6) || Familia (16) || Rogers Centre || 26,038 || 34–49
|-style=background:#bfb
|84||July 6|| Rays || 5–1 || Familia (4–4) || Roe (1–2) ||—|| Citi Field || 24,236 || 35–49
|-style=background:#fbb
|85||July 7|| Rays || 0–3 ||Snell (12–4) || Matz (4–6) || Romo (9) || Citi Field || 32,986 || 35–50
|-style=background:#fbb
|86||July 8|| Rays || 0–9 || Eovaldi (3–3) || Flexen (0–2) ||—|| Citi Field || 24,653 || 35–51
|-style=background:#bfb
|87||July 9 (1)|| Phillies || 4–3(10) || Peterson (2–1) || Arano (1–1) ||—|| Citi Field || — || 36–51
|-style=background:#fbb
|88||July 9 (2)|| Phillies || 1–3 || Nola (12–2) || Oswalt (0–2) || Arano (3) || Citi Field || 24,139 || 36–52 
|-style=background:#fbb
|89||July 10|| Phillies || 3–7 || Del Los Santos (1–0) || Gagnon (0–1) ||—|| Citi Field || 22,416 || 36–53 
|-style=background:#bfb
|90||July 11|| Phillies || 3–0(10)|| Gsellman (6–2) || Leiter (0–1) ||—|| Citi Field || 22,137 || 37–53 
|-style=background:#fbb
|91||July 12|| Nationals || 4–5 || Scherzer (12–5) || Matz (4–7) || Madson (4) || Citi Field || 28,120 || 37–54
|-style=background:#bfb
|92||July 13|| Nationals || 2–4 || Syndergaard (5–1) || Roark (3–12) || Gsellman (4) || Citi Field || 26,558 || 38–54 
|-style=background:#bfb
|93||July 14|| Nationals || 7–4 || Wheeler (3–6) || Voth (0–1) || Familia (17) || Citi Field || 30,438 || 39–54
|-style=background:#fbb
|94||July 15|| Nationals || 1–6 || Hellickson (4–1) || Swarzak (0–2) || — || Citi Field || 26,572 || 39–55
|-style=background:#bff
|colspan="10"|89th All-Star Game in Washington, D.C.
|-style=background:#bfb
|95||July 20||@ Yankees || 7–5 || Syndergaard (6–1) || Germán (2–6) || Gsellman (5) || Yankee Stadium || 47,175 || 40–55
|-style=background:#fbb
|96||July 21||@ Yankees || 6–7 || Gray (7–7) || Matz (4–8) || Shreve (1) || Yankee Stadium || 47,102 || 40–56
|-style=background:#bbb
|—||July 22||@ Yankees || colspan=7 | Postponed (inclement weather). Makeup date: August 13
|-style=background:#fbb
|97||July 23|| Padres || 2–3 || Lucchesi (5–5)|| deGrom (5–5) || Yates (3) || Citi Field || 21,731 || 40–57
|-style=background:#bfb
|98||July 24|| Padres || 6–3 || Wheeler (4–6) || Lauer (5–7) ||—|| Citi Field || 21,925 || 41–57
|-style=background:#bfb
|99||July 25|| Padres || 6–4 || Oswalt (1–2)|| Richard (7–10)|| Swarzak (2) || Citi Field || 30,963 || 42–57
|-style=background:#bfb
|100||July 26||@ Pirates || 12–6 || Matz (5–8) || Kingham (5–5) ||—|| PNC Park || 21,981 || 43–57
|-style=background:#fbb
|101||July 27||@ Pirates || 4–5 || Vázquez (4–2)|| Peterson (2–2) ||—|| PNC Park || 26,356 || 43–58
|-style=background:#fbb
|102||July 28||@ Pirates || 0–5 || Williams (9–7)|| deGrom (5–6) ||—|| PNC Park || 35,900 || 43–59
|-style=background:#bfb
|103||July 29||@ Pirates || 1–0 || Wheeler (5–6) || Musgrove (4–5) || Swarzak (3) || PNC Park || 23,749 || 44–59
|-style=background:#fbb
|104||July 31||@ Nationals || 4–25 || Roark (5–12) || Matz (5–9) || — || Nationals Park || 35,029 || 44–60
|-

|-style=background:#fbb
|105||August 1||@ Nationals || 3–5 || Milone (1–0) || Syndergaard (6–2) || Herrera (16) || Nationals Park || 34,319 || 44–61
|-style=background:#fbb
|106||August 2|| Braves || 2–4 || Foltynewicz (8–7) || Vargas (2–7) || Minter (7) || Citi Field || 24,525 || 44–62
|-style=background:#fbb
|107||August 3|| Braves || 1–2 || Sánchez (6–3) || deGrom (5–7) || Minter (8) || Citi Field || 25,101 || 44–63
|-style=background:#bfb
|108||August 4|| Braves || 3–0 || Wheeler (6–6) || Gausman (5–9) || Gsellman (6) || Citi Field || 36,946 || 45–63
|-style=background:#fbb
|109||August 5|| Braves || 4–5(10) || Minter (4–2) || Bashlor (0–1) || Biddle (1) || Citi Field || 27,134 || 45–64
|-style=background:#bfb
|110||August 6|| Reds || 6–4 || Syndergaard (7–2) || Bailey (1–9) || Blevins (1) || Citi Field || 21,644 || 46–64
|-style=background:#fbb
|111||August 7|| Reds || 1–6 || Romano (7–9) || Vargas (2–8) ||—|| Citi Field || 22,207 || 46–65
|-style=background:#bfb
|112||August 8|| Reds || 8–0 || deGrom (6–7) || Stephenson (0–1) ||—|| Citi Field || 24,287 || 47–65
|-style=background:#bfb
|113||August 10||@ Marlins || 6–2 || Wheeler (7–6) || Ureña (3–12) ||—|| Marlins Park || 6,993 || 48–65
|-style=background:#fbb
|114||August 11||@ Marlins || 3–4(11) || Guerra (1–0) || Rhame (0–2) ||—|| Marlins Park || 11,478 || 48–66
|-style=background:#bfb
|115||August 12||@ Marlins || 4–3 || Syndergaard (8–2)|| Chen (4–9)|| Lugo (1) || Marlins Park || 8,964 || 49–66
|-style=background:#bfb
|116||August 13|| @ Yankees || 8–5 || deGrom (7–7) || Severino (15–6) || Gsellman (7) || Yankee Stadium || 47,233 || 50–66
|-style=background:#fbb
|117||August 14||@ Orioles || 3–6 || Cashner (4–10) || Wahl (0–1) || Givens (4) || Oriole Park at Camden Yards || 20,527 || 50–67
|-style=background:#bfb
|118||August 15||@ Orioles || 16–5 || Wheeler (8–6) || Bundy (7–11) ||—|| Oriole Park at Camden Yards || 25,045 || 51–67
|-style=background:#bfb
|119||August 16||@ Phillies || 24–4 || Oswalt (2–2) || Suárez (1–1) ||—|| Citizens Bank Park ||—|| 52–67
|-style=background:#fbb
|120||August 16||@ Phillies || 6–9 ||Eflin (9–4) ||Matz (5–10) || Domínguez (14) || Citizens Bank Park || 33,049 || 52–68
|-style=background:#fbb
|121||August 17||@ Phillies || 2–4 || Nola (14–3) || Syndergaard (8–3) || Neshek (3) || Citizens Bank Park || 40,460 || 52–69
|-style=background:#bfb
|122||August 18||@ Phillies || 3–1 || deGrom (8–7) || Arrieta (9–8) ||—|| Citizens Bank Park || 35,158 || 53–69
|-style=background:#bfb
|123||August 19||@ Phillies || 8–2 || Vargas (3–8) || Pivetta (7–10) ||—|| BB&T Ballpark (Williamsport, PA) || 2,429 || 54–69
|-style=background:#fbb
|124||August 20|| Giants || 1–2(13) || Law (1–0) || Bashlor (0–2) ||—|| Citi Field || 24,811 || 54–70
|-style=background:#bfb
|125||August 21|| Giants || 6–3 || Oswalt (3–2) || Watson (4–5) ||—|| Citi Field || 24,999 || 55–70
|-style=background:#bfb
|126||August 22|| Giants || 5–3 || Syndergaard (9–3) || Kelly (0–2) || Sewald (1) || Citi Field || 28,157 || 56–70
|-style=background:#fbb
|127||August 23|| Giants || 1–3 || Bumgarner (5–5) ||  deGrom (8–8) || Smith (11) || Citi Field || 25,584 || 56–71
|-style=background:#bfb
|128||August 24|| Nationals || 3–0 || Vargas (4–8) || González (7–11) || Gsellman (8) || Citi Field || 23,763 || 57–71
|-style=background:#bfb
|129||August 25|| Nationals || 3–0 || Wheeler (9–6) || Roark (8–13) || — || Citi Field || 29,868 || 58–71
|-style=background:#fbb
|130||August 26|| Nationals || 0–15 || Rodríguez (2–1) || Matz (5–11) || — || Citi Field || 23,192 || 58–72
|-style=background:#fbb
|131||August 27||@ Cubs || 4–7 || Cishek (4–1) || Blevins (1–2) || Chavez (3) || Wrigley Field || 38,935 || 58–73
|-style=background:#bbb
|—||August 28||@ Cubs || colspan=7 | Suspended (inclement weather: rain). Completion date: August 29 
|-style=background:#fbb
|132||August 29||@ Cubs || 1–2 (11) || Chavez (5–2) || Sewald (0–5) ||—|| Wrigley Field || 37,017 || 58–74
|-style=background:#bfb
|133||August 29||@ Cubs || 10–3 || Vargas (5–8) || Mills (0–1) ||—|| Wrigley Field || 33,386 || 59–74
|-style=background:#fbb
|134||August 31||@ Giants || 0–7 || Suárez (6–9) || Wheeler (9–7) ||—|| AT&T Park || 39,057 || 59–75
|-

|-style=background:#bfb
|135||September 1||@ Giants || 2–1 (11) || Blevins (2–2) || Strickland (3–4) || Gsellman (9)|| AT&T Park || 38,875 || 60–75
|-style=background:#bfb
|136||September 2||@ Giants || 4–1 || Syndergaard (10–3) || Stratton (9–8) ||—|| AT&T Park || 39,692 || 61–75
|-style=background:#bfb
|137||September 3||@ Dodgers || 4–2 || Smith (1–0)|| Maeda (8–9) || Gsellman (10) || Dodger Stadium || 45,206 || 62–75
|-style=background:#fbb
|138||September 4||@ Dodgers || 4–11 || Hill (7–5) || Vargas (5–9) ||—|| Dodger Stadium || 46,651 || 62–76
|-style=background:#bfb
|139||September 5||@ Dodgers || 7–3 || Wheeler (10–7) || Ryu (4–2) ||—|| Dodger Stadium || 40,317 || 63–76
|-style=background:#fbb
|140||September 7|| Phillies || 3–4 || Nola (16–4) || Bashlor (0–3) || Hunter (4) || Citi Field || 23,379 || 63–77
|-style=background:#bfb
|141||September 8|| Phillies || 10–5 || Syndergaard (11–3) || Eflin (9–7) ||—|| Citi Field || 25,094 || 64–77
|-style=background:#bfb
|142||September 9|| Phillies || 6–4 || Gagnon (1–1) || Velasquez (9–11) || Lugo (2) || Citi Field || 24,153 || 65–77
|-style=background:#bbb
|—||September 10|| Marlins || colspan=7 | Postponed (inclement weather: rain). Makeup date: September 12 
|-style=background:#fbb
|143||September 11|| Marlins || 3–5 || Ureña (6–12) || deGrom (8–9) ||—|| Citi Field || 20,849 || 65–78
|-style=background:#bfb
|144||September 12|| Marlins || 13–0 || Wheeler (11–7) || Richards (3–9) ||—|| Citi Field || 20,423 || 66–78
|-style=background:#bbb
|—||September 12|| Marlins || colspan=7 | Postponed (inclement weather: rain). Makeup date: September 13|-style=background:#bfb
|145||September 13|| Marlins || 4–3 || Blevins (3–2) || Barraclough (0–6) ||—|| Citi Field || — || 67–78
|-style=background:#bfb
|146||September 13|| Marlins || 5–2 || Vargas (6–9) || Brigham (0–2) || Gsellman (11) || Citi Field || 22,640 || 68–78
|-style=background:#bfb
|147||September 14||@ Red Sox || 8–0 || Syndergaard (12–3) || Cuevas (0–1) ||—|| Fenway Park || 37,117 || 69–78
|-style=background:#fbb
|148||September 15||@ Red Sox || 3–5 || Porcello (17–7) || Sewald (0–6) || Kimbrel (41) || Fenway Park || 36,611 || 69–79
|-style=background:#fbb
|149||September 16||@ Red Sox || 3–4 || Workman (6-0) || Lugo (3–4) || Wright (1) || Fenway Park || 36,526 || 69–80
|-style=background:#bfb
|150||September 17||@ Phillies || 9–4 || Wheeler (12–7) ||  Hunter (4–3) ||—|| Citizens Bank Park || 21,767 || 70–80
|-style=background:#fbb
|151||September 18||@ Phillies || 2–5 || Neshek (3–1) || Smith (1–1) || Neris (11) || Citizens Bank Park || 18,895 || 70–81
|-style=background:#fbb
|152||September 19||@ Phillies || 0–4 || Eflin (11–7) || Syndergaard (12–4) || — || Citizens Bank Park || 19,085 || 70–82
|-style=background:#bfb
|153||September 20||@ Nationals || 5–4(12) || Rhame (1–2) || Rodriguez (3–3) || Sewald (2) || Nationals Park || 28,258 || 71–82
|-style=background:#bfb
|154||September 21||@ Nationals || 4–2 || deGrom (9–9) || Ross (0–1) || Gsellman (12) || Nationals Park || 37,895 || 72–82
|-style=background:#fbb
|155||September 22||@ Nationals || 0–6 || Voth (1–1) || Oswalt (3–3) || — || Nationals Park || 39,372 || 72–83
|-style=background:#bfb
|156||September 23||@ Nationals || 8–6 || Gagnon (2–1) || Suero (3–1) || Swarzak (4) || Nationals Park || 34,218 || 73–83
|-style=background:#fbb
|157||September 25|| Braves|| 3–7 || Winkler (4–0) || Gsellman (6–3) ||—|| Citi Field || 21,943 || 73–84
|-style=background:#bfb
|158||September 26|| Braves || 3–0 || deGrom (10–9) || Jackson (1–2) || Lugo (3) || Citi Field || 23,205 || 74–84
|-style=background:#bfb
|159||September 27|| Braves || 4–1 || Vargas (7–9)|| Teherán (9–9) || Gsellman (13) || Citi Field || 24,824 || 75–84
|-style=background:#fbb
|160||September 28|| Marlins || 1–8 || Ureña (9–12) || Sewald (0–7) || — || Citi Field || 27,045 || 75–85
|-style=background:#bfb
|161||September 29|| Marlins || 1–0(13) || Zamora (1–0) || García (3–3) || — || Citi Field || 43,928 || 76–85
|-style=background:#bfb
|162||September 30|| Marlins || 1–0 || Syndergaard (13–4) || Alcántara (2–3) || — || Citi Field || 28,346 || 77–85 
|-

|- style="text-align:center;"
| Legend:       = Win       = Loss       = PostponementBold = Mets team member

Farm system

See also
 2018 MLB Little League Classic

References

External links
2018 New York Mets season Official Site
2018 New York Mets season at Baseball Reference''

New York Mets seasons
New York Mets season
New York Mets
2010s in Queens
Flushing, Queens